Saint-Édouard may refer to:

The French name for Saint Edward
Saint-Édouard, Quebec, a parish in Montérégie, Quebec, Canada
Saint-Édouard-de-Fabre, Quebec, a parish in Abitibi-Témiscamingue, Quebec, Canada
Saint-Édouard-de-Lotbinière, Quebec, a parish in Chaudière-Appalaches, Quebec, Canada
Saint-Édouard-de-Maskinongé, Quebec, a municipality in Mauricie, Quebec, Canada
St. Edouard, Alberta, a hamlet in the County of St. Paul No. 19, Alberta, Canada

See also
Saint Edward (disambiguation)